Federico Cesi (July 2, 1500—January 28, 1565) was an Italian Roman Catholic bishop and cardinal.

Biography

Federico Cesi was born in Rome on July 2, 1500, the son of Roman noble Angelo Cesi of the House of Cesi and his wife Francesca Cardoli. He was the younger brother of Cardinal Paolo Emilio Cesi.

He studied law at the University of Rome and then practiced law in Rome.  He later left legal practice to become a priest.

On June 12, 1523, he was elected Bishop of Todi, with dispensation for not having reached the canonical age.  He was consecrated as a bishop in Rome on July 25, 1524 by Paris de Grassis, Bishop of Pesaro.  He soon became a member of the Apostolic Camera.

Pope Paul III made him a cardinal priest in the consistory of December 19, 1544.  He received the red hat and the titular church of San Pancrazio on July 9, 1545.  He resigned the government of the Diocese of Todi on March 11, 1545.  From November 9, 1549 to February 12, 1552, he was the administrator of the Diocese of Caserta.

He participated in the papal conclave of 1549-50 that elected Pope Julius III.  He opted for the titular church of Santa Prisca on February 28, 1550.

From July 15, 1550 to March 14, 1551, he was the administrator of the Diocese of Vulturaria e Montecorvino.  He then administered the Diocese of Cremona from March 18, 1551 until March 13, 1560.  He also served as Camerlengo of the Sacred College of Cardinals from January 7, 1555 to January 10, 1556.

He was a participant in both the papal conclave of April 1555 that elected Pope Marcellus II and the papal conclave of May 1555 that elected Pope Paul IV.

On September 20, 1557, he opted for the order of cardinal bishops, receiving the suburbicarian see of Palestrina.

He then participated in the papal conclave of 1559 that elected Pope Pius IV.

He opted for the suburbicarian see of Frascati on May 18, 1562, and then for the suburbicarian see of Porto e Santa Rufina on May 12, 1564.  During this period he was Vice-Dean of the College of Cardinals.

Cardinal Cesi was friends with Charles Borromeo, Ignatius of Loyola, and Philip Neri.

Cardinal Cesi died in Rome on January 28, 1565.  Following a funeral at Santa Caterina dei Funari, he was buried in the Basilica di Santa Maria Maggiore.

References

1500 births
1565 deaths
Clergy from Rome
16th-century Italian cardinals
16th-century Italian Roman Catholic bishops
Cesi family